The 1949–50 İstanbul Football League season was the 40th season of the league. Beşiktaş JK won the league for the 10th time.

Season

References

Istanbul Football League seasons
Turkey
2